Nura: Rise of the Yokai Clan is an anime series adapted from the manga series of the same title written and illustrated by Hiroshi Shiibashi. The anime series, produced by Studio Deen, aired from July 6 to December 21, 2010.

The season uses four pieces of theme music: two opening themes and two ending themes. From episodes 1–12, the first opening theme is Fast Forward performed by Monkey Majik while the ending theme is Sparky☆Start performed by Katate Size (Aya Hirano, Yui Horie and Ai Maeda). From episodes 13–24, the second opening theme is Sunshine performed by Monkey Majik and the second ending theme is Symphonic Dream performed by Katate Size (Aya Hirano, Yui Horie and Ai Maeda).



Episode list

References

2010 Japanese television seasons
Nura: Rise of the Yokai Clan episode lists